The Tratturo Pescasseroli-Candela is a drovers' road running between Pescasseroli in Abruzzo and Candela in Apulia. It is the third longest such route in southern Italy, and is also named La via della lana ("The wool pathway").

Geography 

It is still used for seasonal migration of herds. Some historians, such as Wisemann, believe that it follows the same route as the Via Minucia Traiana, an ancient Roman road.

References 

Ancient roads and tracks